Stratiomys singularia, the flecked general, is a Palearcticspecies of soldier fly.

Description
Body length 13,5-17 mm. Eyes of the male hairy, and those of the female without any yellow postocular collar. Tibiae and venter mainly black, the latter with pale bands. Abdomen dorsally with three pairs of small, yellow spots and the apex yellow or orange.

Biology
Found in wetland habitats, humid places, brackish water from June to August. The adults feed on the nectar and pollen of Umbelliferae. The larvae are detritus feeding in shallow, sometimes temporary pools.

Distribution
Western Europe, European Russia, Caucasus, Russian Far East, Siberia, Central Asia.

References

Stratiomyidae
Diptera of Europe
Insects described in 1776
Taxa named by Moses Harris